Atol das Rocas Biological Reserve is a biological reserve in Brazil. 
The reserve is located on the Rocas Atoll, an atoll 144 miles north east of the Brazilian coast. 
It  was created in 1979 to protect nesting sea turtles and migratory seabirds.

Location

The coral atoll is built on the upper, western part of the flat top of a volcanic seamount on the north east part of the Brazilian continental margin. 

The sediment in the lagoon and surrounding the atoll is mostly coarse sand, much of which originates from the corals and mollusc shells.
There are two small islands inside the lagoon.
It was created on 5 June 1979 and is administered by the Chico Mendes Institute for Biodiversity Conservation.

Environment

Rainfall is  annually.
The islands are remote and have not been affected much by human activity.
An estimated 143,000 birds use the atoll, mainly masked booby (Sula dactylatra), brown booby (Sula leucogaster), brown noddy (Anous stolidus), black noddy (Anous minutus) and sooty tern (Onychoprion fuscatus).

Conservation

The Biological Reserve is a "strict nature reserve" under IUCN protected area category Ia.
The objectives are full preservation of biota and other natural attributes without direct human interference or environmental changes, except for recovery of altered ecosystems and actions needed to restore and preserve the natural balance, biological diversity and natural ecological processes.
Protected species include the loggerhead sea turtle (Caretta caretta), hawksbill sea turtle (Eretmochelys imbricata), green sea turtle (Chelonia mydas), red-billed tropicbird (Phaethon aethereus), white-tailed tropicbird (Phaethon lepturus), the crabs Johngarthia lagostoma and Percnon gibbesi, the starfish Echinaster (Othilia) guyanensis, lemon shark (Negaprion brevirostris), sea ginger (Millepora alcicornis) and the coral Phyllogorgia dilatata.
The reserve has been nominated as a World Heritage Site.

References

Sources

Biological reserves of Brazil
Protected areas established in 1979
Protected areas of Rio Grande do Norte
1979 establishments in Brazil
Ramsar sites in Brazil